Kihaadhoo (Dhivehi: ކިހާދޫ) is one of the inhabited islands of Baa Atoll.

History 
It was evident that the people have lived in the eastern part of the island at first, and moved to the current place about 80 years ago. The migration was mainly due to contamination of groundwater and increased death rate. There were so many stories regarding the migrations and the recent migration was only about 35 years ago when people of Kihaadhoo was taken to Baa Hithaadhoo from which they came back due to discriminations and minority issues.

Geography 
The Island Kihaadhoo is located in northern central of South Maalhosmadulu or Baa Atoll. The island is relatively large with 31.4 hectares of land to its small population of around 500. The closest inhabited island is Dhonfanu, to which its takes only few minutes to go by a dhoani. The island has a small harbour for transporting goods and people from nearby islands.

Demography

Economy
The main income for people of Kihaadhoo includes tourism, fishing and some agricultural activities. The island is famous in weaving from coconut leaves and it holds a strong name in the Maldivian society.

Education
Kihaadhoo school which is now built at the western part of the island provide education for all school age children of Kihaadhoo and some students from neighboring places.

References

Islands of the Maldives